Nagolny is a rural locality (a khutor) and the administrative center of Nagolenskoye Rural Settlement, Kotelnikovsky District, Volgograd Oblast, Russia. The population was 1,065 as of 2010. There are 14 streets.

Geography 
Nagolny is located on the right bank of the Nagolnaya River, 7 km south of Kotelnikovo (the district's administrative centre) by road. Kotelnikovo is the nearest rural locality.

References 

Rural localities in Kotelnikovsky District